The Battle of Ontario is a National Hockey League (NHL) rivalry between the Ottawa Senators and the Toronto Maple Leafs. Both teams compete in the Atlantic Division and with current NHL scheduling, they meet three to four times per season. Games between the teams are often televised nationally on Hockey Night in Canada. The rivalry has been described as one of the NHL's top rivalries.

Background
Games between Toronto and Ottawa ice hockey teams date back before the founding of the NHL. In 1891, the original Senators defeated the St. George club of Toronto to win the Ontario ice hockey title. In February 1904, the original Ottawa Senators, aka the 'Silver Seven', defeated the Toronto Marlboros in a Stanley Cup challenge. The Senators were founding members of the National Hockey Association (NHA) in 1910 and Toronto teams joined the NHA two years later. In 1917, the Toronto NHA franchise was turned over to the NHL and joined the Senators as one of the founding teams of the NHL. After the original Ottawa NHL franchise relocated to St. Louis, Missouri, as the Eagles in 1934, With the coming of television broadcasting of NHL games in the 1950s, Ottawa-area NHL hockey fans became fans of other NHL teams. A Toronto-Ottawa sports rivalry continued between the Argonauts and the Rough Riders of the Canadian Football League (CFL).

History
The current Senators entered the NHL in 1992, but the rivalry between the two teams did not begin to emerge until the late 1990s. From 1992 to 1998, Toronto was in the Western Conference and Ottawa was in the Eastern Conference, which meant that the two teams rarely played each other. But before the 1998–99 season, the conferences and divisions were re-aligned, and Toronto was moved into the Eastern Conference's Northeast Division with the Senators, Montreal Canadiens, Boston Bruins and Buffalo Sabres.

The rivalry reached new heights in 2000, as the teams met for the first time in the playoffs with the Maple Leafs dispatching the Senators in six games. Some Maple Leafs fans saw this as revenge, since the Senators' Marian Hossa had accidentally clipped the Maple Leafs' Bryan Berard in the eye on March 11, ending the young defenceman's season and almost his career.

21st century
The next season, they met again in the first round as Ottawa entered the playoffs ranked second in the East and the Maple Leafs seventh. While the Senators were expected to defeat the Maple Leafs, especially since they had swept the regular season series against them, the Maple Leafs swept the series in a major upset instead; Ottawa did not score their first goal of the series until 16:51 of the third period in the third game.

In , the teams met in the playoffs for the third-straight year. The two teams were very evenly matched, and the Maple Leafs managed to win the second-round series in the full seven games and advance to the conference finals. One notable incident occurred late in game five, when Senators captain Daniel Alfredsson hit forward Darcy Tucker in a questionable hit-from-behind (that did not draw a penalty), and then seconds after hitting Tucker, scored the game-winning goal.

In , the rivalry hit an all-time high when Darcy Tucker attacked the Senators' Chris Neil, who was sitting on the bench. This resulted in numerous players exchanging punches before order was restored. Tucker, Neil and Shane Hnidy all received fighting majors and game misconducts for the same incident. After the game, Tucker claimed Neil spit on him, an allegation which Neil denied. The NHL board looked into this claim and concluded that Tucker's allegation was false. Tempers remained frayed, especially with 1:23 to play, when Toronto's Tie Domi went after Magnus Arvedson and threw several punches at Arvedson. Video evidence showed Arvedson spearing Domi just prior, awaiting the faceoff. Domi received a roughing minor, instigator minor, fighting major, misconduct and game misconduct. Arvedson did not get a penalty on the play. Suspensions were announced a few hours after Tucker and Domi appeared at NHL head offices in Toronto for a hearing. Tucker was suspended for five games, without pay, after it was determined that Neil did not spit at Toronto's bench. Domi was suspended for three games, also without pay. A total of 163 minutes in penalties were called in the game.

On January 6, 2004, the Maple Leafs were playing a game against the Nashville Predators, when Leaf captain Mats Sundin's stick broke on an attempted shot at the blue line and he threw it away in disgust. Instead of hitting the glass, the stick accidentally went over and into the crowd. The NHL reacted by giving him a one-game suspension. The game he was suspended for was a game against the Senators in Toronto. During the game, Daniel Alfredsson's stick broke, and he immediately faked a toss of his stick into the stands. This caused an uproar with the Maple Leafs, in part because they had also lost the game 7–1. Alfredsson dismissed the Maple Leafs' reaction, calling it an over-reaction. This incident added to the rivalry, and Maple Leafs fans would boo Alfredsson at every opportunity for the remainder of his career.

Alfredsson guaranteed a victory after the Maple Leafs took game five to lead 3–2. He delivered on his promise in game six, but Ottawa goaltender Patrick Lalime turned in a lacklustre performance in the series finale, allowing two soft goals to Joe Nieuwendyk and the Maple Leafs to win the series. After the series, the Senators traded Lalime to the St. Louis Blues and Ottawa head coach Jacques Martin was fired. The series win is the most recent playoff series win by the Maple Leafs.

Post-lockout era
In , the two teams nearly met again in the playoffs, but the Maple Leafs missed qualifying by two points. As the Senators clinched the top spot in the East, the Maple Leafs claiming eighth position would have ensured a first-round match-up. The Senators largely dominated the season series by winning seven of the eight games (including three routs of 8–0, 8–2 and 7–0).

In , the Maple Leafs failed to qualify for the playoffs, finishing in ninth position, and thereby missing for a second consecutive year. Meanwhile, the Senators made it to the Stanley Cup Finals. The Senators won the season series 5-1-2.

The  season was characterized by a share of lopsided victories by the two teams against each other; for example, wins of 5–0 and 8–2. The Maple Leafs failed to make the playoffs for the third-straight season, this time by 11 points. Ottawa finished in seventh place in the East after a 15–2 start and leading the league at one point, barely making it into the playoffs. The Senators were swept 4–0 in the first round by the Pittsburgh Penguins in a rematch of the previous year's series. Although Pittsburgh was heavily favoured to win, the fact that the Maple Leafs' Mark Bell laid what Jason Spezza described as a "clean dirty hit" on Daniel Alfredsson in the April 3 game at Toronto, thereby sidelining him, may have worsened their situation.

The  season was a poor one for both teams, with the Senators finishing 11th and the Maple Leafs 12th in the Eastern Conference. This marked the first time that both Ontario teams failed to qualify for the Stanley Cup playoffs since the Senators joined the NHL in 1992.

The  season saw the Senators finish fifth in the Eastern Conference and face the Pittsburgh Penguins in the first round of the playoffs, while the Maple Leafs finished last in the conference and failed to make the playoffs for the fifth consecutive year. The Maple Leafs won the season series, however, 4–2.

The  season was a poor one for both the Ontario teams. Despite the Maple Leafs posting its best regular season record since the  season, the team missed the playoffs for the sixth consecutive season. Meanwhile, the Senators finished with a record of 32–40–10 and missed the playoffs for the second time in three seasons. The 74 points put up by the Senators was the lowest total put up since the  season. The season series was tied 3–3.

The  season saw Ottawa hosting the 59th NHL All-Star Game. A franchise-high five Senators were elected to the team – Daniel Alfredsson, Milan Michalek, Erik Karlsson, Jason Spezza and Colin Greening represented the Senators. Meanwhile, Phil Kessel, Joffrey Lupul and Dion Phaneuf represented the Maple Leafs. Senators defenceman Erik Karlsson ended the season with 78 points and won the Norris Trophy. The Senators finish eighth in the East and qualified for the playoffs, while the Maple Leafs once again failed to qualify for the seventh consecutive season. The season series was again tied 3–3.

The  season was cut short by the most recent lock-out, which delayed opening day until January 19, 2013. The Maple Leafs and Senators met five times in the 48-game season, with the Maple Leafs taking the season series 4–1. Toronto would finish the shortened season in fifth place in the Eastern Conference and clinch their first playoff spot since 2004, while Ottawa would finish seventh in the East. The Senators were matched up in the first round versus the Montreal Canadiens. They took the series in five games before falling to the Pittsburgh Penguins in the second round. The Maple Leafs lost in game seven against the Boston Bruins and failed to pass the first round.

The  season saw both Ontario teams miss the playoffs for the first time since the  season. The Maple Leafs and Senators met four times in the 82-game season, two of which were decided in shootouts. The Maple Leafs took the season series 3–1. The Senators would finish 11th in the East with 88 points, and the Maple Leafs finished in 12th place with 84 points.

The  season saw the Senators finish seventh in the Eastern Conference with 99 points, securing the first wildcard playoff position. The Maple Leafs failed to make the playoffs finishing last in the Eastern Conference with 68 points. On October 22, 2014, the game between Maple Leafs and Senators was postponed due to the 2014 Ottawa shootings. It was rescheduled for November 9, in which the Maple Leafs won 5–3. The Senators' defenceman Erik Karlsson won the Norris Trophy for the second time in his career. The Maple Leafs took the season series 3–2, two games were settled in OT/SO.

The  season ended with the Senators sweeping the season series 4–0 over the Maple Leafs. The Senators finished fifth in the Atlantic Division and eight points out of playoff contention. The Maple Leafs had a season finishing last in the league. On February 9, 2016, there was a rare trade between the two division rivals. The trade saw Maple Leafs captain Dion Phaneuf, Matt Frattin, Casey Bailey, Ryan Rupert, and Cody Donaghey traded to Ottawa for Jared Cowen, Milan Michalek, Colin Greening, Tobias Lindberg, and a second-round pick in the 2017 NHL Entry Draft.

The  season proved to be a successful season for both teams. The Maple Leafs came into the season loaded with rookies, while the Senators were a mix of young and veteran players. In the season opener, Ottawa and Toronto faced each other. The Maple Leafs' rookie centre Auston Matthews scored four goals in his NHL debut, but the Senators prevailed 5–4 in overtime. Ottawa won 3–1 in the season series. The Senators and Maple Leafs surprised many, as Ottawa finished second in the Atlantic, while Toronto grabbed the second wild card spot in the playoffs. Toronto fell short to the Washington Capitals in game six of the first round. Ottawa continued their postseason run all the way to the second overtime of game seven of the Eastern Conference Finals against the Pittsburgh Penguins (beating the Boston Bruins and New York Rangers).

After the  season, the Maple Leafs and Senators made another major trade. The Maple Leafs traded Nikita Zaitsev, Connor Brown, and prospect Michael Carcone to the Ottawa Senators for Cody Ceci, Ben Harpur, prospect Aaron Luchuck, and a third-round pick in the 2020 NHL Entry Draft.

For the shortened  season, the two teams were scheduled to play each other nine times in the North Division as the NHL temporarily realigned the divisions due to the COVID-19 pandemic. On February 15, 2021, Toronto blow a 5–1 lead against Ottawa, losing 6–5 in overtime. Nick Paul of the Senators started the comeback with a shorthanded goal. In the third period, Artyom Zub scored his first NHL goal on a breakaway after exiting the penalty box. Connor Brown later scored just after a power play, and Evgenii Dadonov tied the game with two minutes to play with Ottawa goalie Marcus Hogberg on the bench for an extra attacker. In the overtime, the Maple Leafs nearly scored, however, Dadonov made a save while in the crease, then was set up on a breakaway. Dadonov scored to win the game 6–5. This comeback marked the first win by Ottawa after trailing by four goals at any point in a game.

References

History of the Toronto Maple Leafs
History of the Ottawa Senators (1992–)
National Hockey League rivalries
Northeast Division (NHL)
1992 establishments in Ontario